Clinton Hotel Miami Beach or The New Clinton Hotel And Spa is an Art Deco hotel located in Miami Beach, Florida.

History and Renovation
Clinton Hotel Miami Beach was originally built in 1934 by architect Charles Neidler. The Clinton Hotel was renovated in 2004 by designer Eric Raffy. The total cost of the renovation was $12 million. The New Clinton Hotel and Spa is in the heart of Miami's South Beach.

Sources 
Travel, The Palm Beach Post Sunday
Hotel Business

References
 miamibeach411- Website

External links
 Clinton Hotel Miami Beach Website

Art Deco architecture in Florida
Art Deco hotels
Hotels in Miami Beach, Florida
Hotels established in 1934
Hotel buildings completed in 1934